Servet Güler Kıpçak Ökten (born 14 November 1941) is a Turkish actress. She is best known for her roles in Bizimkiler Türkan and in Yaprak Dökümü as Cevriye.

A graduate of conservatory, she was among the students trained by Yıldız Kenter. Her father, Kani Kıpçak, was an actor and director as well. Ökten started her acting career in 1947 with a small role in a movie. She started appearing on stage in 1960 and appeared in many movies and TV series afterwards.

Filmography 

 Bir Demet Menekşe – 1973
 Kapıcılar Kralı – 1976
 Şabanoğlu Şaban – 1977
 Seninle Son Defa – 1978
 Sürü – 1978
 İsyan – 1979
 Demiryolu – 1979
 At – 1981
 Kırık Bir Aşk Hikayesi – 1981
 Fidan – 1984
 Bir Kadın Bir Hayat – 1985
 Gülüşan – 1985
 Asiye Nasıl Kurtulur? – 1986
 Bekçi – 1986
 Asılacak Kadın – 1986
  – 1986
 Dilan – 1986
 Afife Jale – 1987
 Biri ve Diğerleri – 1987
 Hüzün Çemberi – 1988
 Geçmiş Bahar Mimozaları – 1989
 Bizimkiler – 1989
 Cahide – 1989
 Hiçbir Gece – 1989
 Çiçekler Boy Verince – 1990
 Bir Milyara Bir Çocuk – 1990
 Yıldızlar Gece Büyür – 1991
 Acılar ve Arzular – 1991
 Yazlıkçılar – 1993
 Saygılar Bizden – 1993
 C Blok – 1993
 Ali / Sakın Arkana Bakma – 1996
 Baba Evi – 1997
 Mektup – 1997
 Kaçıklık Diploması – 1998
 Günaydın İstanbul Kardeş – 1999
 Güle Güle – 1999
 Beni Unutma – 2000
 Bana Şans Dile – 2001
 Canım Kocacığım – 2002
 Gülüm – 2002
 Bana Abi De – 2002
 Sultan Makamı – 2003
 Kalbin Zamanı – 2004
 Perili Ev – 2004
 Çemberimde Gül Oya – 2004 (guest appearance)
 Hırsız Polis – 2005–2006
 Erkek Tarafı – 2005
 Sen Ne Dilersen – 2005
 Kabuslar Evi: Tanıdık Yabancı – 2006
 Yaprak Dökümü – 2007–2010 – Cevriye
 Leyla ile Mecnun – 2011–2012
 Karanlıklar Çiçeği – 2012
 İntikam – 2013 (guest appearance)
 Kara Para Aşk – 2014
 İtirazım Var – 2014 – Ani Hanım
 Aşk ve Gurur – 2017 – Gülnaz Işıl
 Cennet'in Gözyaşları – 2017
 Yürek Çıkmazı – 2022

References

External links 
 

1941 births
Turkish stage actresses
Turkish film actresses
Turkish voice actresses
Turkish television actresses
Living people
People from Isparta
20th-century Turkish actresses
21st-century Turkish actresses